Gerald Strafner (born 3 June 1973) is an Austrian football manager and former player who played as a midfielder.

External links
 

1973 births
Living people
Austrian footballers
Austria international footballers
Austrian Football Bundesliga players
Grazer AK players
SV Ried players
SK Sturm Graz players
FC Kärnten players
Association football midfielders